The Grand Prismatic Spring in Yellowstone National Park is the largest hot spring in the United States, and the third largest in the world, after Frying Pan Lake in New Zealand and Boiling Lake in Dominica. It is located in the Midway Geyser Basin.

Grand Prismatic Spring was noted by geologists working in the Hayden Geological Survey of 1871, and named by them for its striking coloration. Its colors match most of those seen in the rainbow dispersion of white light by an optical prism: red, orange, yellow, green, and blue.

History

The first records of the spring are from early European explorers and surveyors. In 1870 the Washburn–Langford–Doane Expedition visited the spring, noting a  geyser nearby (later named Excelsior).

Color

The bright, vivid colors in the spring are the result of microbial mats around the edges of the mineral-rich water. The mats produce colors ranging from green to red; the amount of color in the microbial mats depends on the ratio of chlorophyll to carotenoids and on the temperature gradient in the runoff. In the summer, the mats tend to be orange and red, whereas in the winter the mats are usually dark green. The center of the pool is sterile due to extreme heat.

The deep blue color of the water in the center of the pool results from the intrinsic blue color of water. The effect is strongest in the center of the spring, because of its sterility and depth.

Physical structure
The spring discharges an estimated  of  water per minute.

References

External links

Geothermal features of Yellowstone National Park
Hot springs of Wyoming
Geothermal features of Teton County, Wyoming
Hot springs of Teton County, Wyoming